Lahe  is a town in Naga Self-Administered Zone of Sagaing Division on the north-west frontier of Burma. 

The Naga New Year festival is held on 15 January, and Lahe, Leshi, Hkamti and Nanyun hosted it in rotation until it became state-sponsored for the benefit of tourism and limited to Leshi and Lahe since 2003 during the time of the ousted prime minister Khin Nyunt.

Naga insurgents fighting against the Indian government have bases in the border area inside Burma. The Burmese army have launched offensives against these camps in recent years following top level meetings between the two countries.

Notes

External links
Satellite map GeoNames
Sagaing Division map:  3=Lahe Asterism
 Photos of Naga New Year Festival
 Photos of Naga New Year Festival at Lahe
Burma's Lost World Bertil Lintner, The Irrawaddy, October 2006

Township capitals of Myanmar
Populated places in Naga Self-Administered Zone
Lahe Township